Nigeria–Trinidad and Tobago relations are bilateral relations between Nigeria and Trinidad and Tobago. Trinidad and Tobago has a high commission in Abuja and Nigeria has a high commission in Port of Spain. The high commission in Port of Spain is concurrently accredited to Barbados, Dominica, Grenada, Guyana, and Suriname, while the high commission in Abuja is concurrently accredited to Algeria, Cameroon, Cote d'Ivoire, Democratic Republic of Congo, Ethiopia, Ghana, Guinea, Kenya, Liberia, Nigeria, Senegal, Sierra Leone, Tanzania, and Uganda. Currently, the high commissioner in Port of Spain is Abubakar Danlami Ibrahim, while the high commissioner in Abuja is Wendell De Landro.

History
Nigeria and Trinidad and Tobago established bilateral relations in 1973, but their shared heritage dates back much further than that. They both achieved independence from the United Kingdom in the early 1960s, and both countries are members of the Commonwealth of Nations. In recent years, the two countries have announced efforts to increase cooperation in areas such as trade and law.

See also 

 Foreign relations of Nigeria
 Foreign relations of Trinidad and Tobago

Notes and references